The 2018 All-Ireland Senior Ladies' Football Championship Final featured  and  for the fourth time in five years.  Cork were aiming to preserve their unbeaten record in All Ireland Finals, however Dublin defeated Cork for the first time. This was the first time Cork had lost an All Ireland Final. Dublin also won back-to-back All-Irelands for the first time. Dublin captain, Sinéad Aherne, was the game's top scorer with  1-7 while Carla Rowe scored a goal in each half. Cork's top scorer was Orla Finn who scored 0-8 from free kicks.

Route to the final

Attendance record
For the second year in succession, the attendance record was broken. In 2017 a crowd of 46,286 attended the final at Croke Park. The 2018 final saw an increase of almost 4,000 as the attendance reached 50,141.  The ladies' final was better attended than the 2018 men's All-Ireland semi-final between Tyrone and Monaghan which was watched by a crowd of 49,696.

TV audience
The 2018 final was broadcast live by TG4.  An average of 179,000 viewers watched the final, representing a 26.1% share of viewing. The match peaked just before the final whistle, at 5.21pm, with 283,500 viewers. The game commanded a 23.7% share of women and a 29.5% share of men.

Match info

Teams

References

All-Ireland Senior Ladies' Football Championship Final
All-Ireland Senior Ladies' Football Championship Finals
Cork county ladies' football team matches
Dublin county ladies' football team matches
All-Ireland Senior Ladies' Football Championship Final
All-Ireland Senior Ladies' Football Championship Final, 2018